Utetheisa vandenberghi is a moth in the family Erebidae. It was described by Nieuwenhuis in 1948. It is found on Sulawesi and Bali.

References

Moths described in 1948
vandenberghi